Blackvoices.com is an American historical website.  The entity appeared on the internet in 1995. According to Streetroachpics.com, Blackvoices.com first appeared as a link on the Orlando Sentinel website.  Barry Cooper was the founder.

History
Early on, website received a five million-dollar investment from Tribune Company, the parent company of the Orlando Sentinel.  From there, Blackvoices.com grew and eventually gained over a million registered users. Later, the site was sold to AOL-Time Warner. Although the site had content targeted towards African-American culture, the site was no longer black-owned. 

At its peak, Blackvoices.com was structured with news articles, a messageboard, and blogs. Users had to be a member of AOL to join the site.

In October 2000, General Motors announced a multimillion-dollar three-year deal to advertise on the site.

Some members were upset with the sale of Blackvoices.com from Tribune to AOL and then from AOL to The Huffington Post.  Although under AOL the messageboard stayed intact with some changes, The Huffington Post has removed the messageboard.

References

Additional sources
 Manor, Robert (February 13, 2004). “AOL acquires Tribune Co.'s BlackVoices Internet site.” Chicago Tribune.
 Lazaroff, Leon (December 20, 2003). “BlackVoices Web site faces shutdown.” Chicago Tribune. 
 Wilde, Candee (February 7, 2000). “Recruiters Discover Diverse Value In Web Sites". Information Week Magazine, pp. 2–3.
 “AOL Appoints New Chief of Black Voices Service.”. July 11, 2005, The Washington Post. 
 Hawkins Jr., Lee (October 13, 1997).“Black Voices heard on the Web: Lack of competition helps fuel growth of service for African-Americans.” Journal Sentinel. 
 “BET and Partners to Launch Black-oriented Portal with a $35 Million Investment, BET.com Aims to Attract One of the Fastest -Growing Segments of Online Users.” August 13, 1999. Philadelphia Inquirer.

External links
 Official website
 Barry Cooper, founder of blackvoices

History websites of the United States